Tiassalé Department is a department of Agnéby-Tiassa Region in Lagunes District, Ivory Coast. In 2021, its population was 278,954 and its seat is the settlement of Tiassalé. The sub-prefectures of the department are Gbolouville, Morokro, N'Douci, and Tiassalé.

History

Tiassalé Department was created in 1988 as a first-level subdivision via a split-off from Abidjan Department.

In 1997, regions were introduced as new first-level subdivisions of Ivory Coast; as a result, all departments were converted into second-level subdivisions. Tiassalé Department was included in Lagunes Region.

In 2011, districts were introduced as new first-level subdivisions of Ivory Coast. At the same time, regions were reorganised and became second-level subdivisions and all departments were converted into third-level subdivisions. At this time, Tiassalé Department became part of Agnéby-Tiassa Region in Lagunes District.

In 2012, two sub-prefectures were split from Tiassalé Department to create Taabo Department.

Notes

Departments of Agnéby-Tiassa
1988 establishments in Ivory Coast
States and territories established in 1988